William Glasier (c. 1525 – 1588), of Chester and Lea-by-Backford, Cheshire, was an English politician.

Family
Glasier was the eldest son of William Glasier from the Isle of Man, who became Mayor of Chester for 1551–2, and his wife Jane née Fletcher. He was educated at the Inner Temple. Glasier married twice: firstly to Elizabeth Aglionby, by whom he had two daughters and two sons, including Hugh Glasier, MP for Chester. His second wife was named Alice.

Career
He was a Member (MP) of the Parliament of England for St Ives in 1563 and in Chester in 1571 and 1572. He was mayor of Chester in 1602–3.

References

1525 births
1588 deaths
Mayors of Chester
English MPs 1563–1567
English MPs 1571
English MPs 1572–1583